Recasens is a surname of Catalan origin. Notable people with the surname include:

Ángel Recasens (1938–2007), Catalan organist, teacher, composer and musicologist
Luis Recasens (1903–1977), Spanish politician and legal philosopher

See also
Requesens (disambiguation)